Per-Mathias Høgmo (born 1 December 1959) is a football manager from Norway and former player. He is the former manager of the Norway national football team. He has previously been head coach of Norway women's national football team and the Tippeligaen sides Tromsø, Moss and Rosenborg. While being head coach of Tromsø he was working on a PhD in football at the university in Tromsø.

Biography 
Høgmo grew up in the small community of Gratangen in southern Troms, and began his football career as a midfielder for his local club Gratangen IL. In 1978, he joined FK Mjølner, the biggest club in his home region, and spent six seasons with the Narvik side before moving to Tromsø in 1984, where he joined Tromsø IL, and spent the rest of his top-level playing career with the exception of a short spell with Swedish team IFK Norrköping in 1985–86. He played for Tromsø until 1988 season, and was a member of the TIL team that won the Norwegian Cup in 1986. He also got one cap for Norway, when he played the last 15 minutes as a substitute for Vegard Skogheim, in a match against Switzerland on 8 November 1986.

Høgmo started his coaching career in Gratangen IL where he served as playing manager in the 1989-season. Following this spell, he served two years in Tromsdalen UIL before moving to Tromsø IL for the 1992-season.

In 1997, Høgmo moved to coaching the women's national football team. In this role, Høgmo achieved considerable success by leading the team to a 4th place in the World Cup of 1999, and a gold medal in the 2000 Sydney Olympics. Between 2000 and 2003, he was hired by national federation to coach the national U21 team. Following this spell, Høgmo returned to Tromsø IL for his second spell at the club. Høgmo spent the 2004 season at Tromsø, taking the team to a 4th place in the league, and qualifying them for Royal League.. By achieving success with Tromsø, Høgmo attracted interest from other clubs, however, and in August, 2005, he was signed by Rosenborg BK to replace Per Joar Hansen. Rosenborg had suffered a tremendously bad start of the season and were closer to the relegation struggle than to the top of the league. Høgmo turned the team around, however, and took the team to a 7th place in the league.

The next season was more difficult for Høgmo. After the team suffered from a slow start of the season, Høgmo took out sick leave and left the club in incertainty. Høgmo's assistant, Knut Tørum, meanwhile did his things well in the club and in October 2006, Høgmo resigned from his position as manager, and said he would withdraw from football to pursue a new career.

Høgmo's stint away from football would last only two years. In 2008, he was signed by Tromsø for the third time, replacing Steinar Nilsen. In his first season at the club, Høgmo took the team to the 3rd spot in the league - improving the team's 6th spot finish in the 2007-season. The 2009-season was slightly more difficult for Høgmo and Tromsø, but the team nevertheless finished 6th in the league. In 2010, success continued for Høgmo when he took the team to the top of the league at the start of the season. Despite slowing off a little after the summer break, Tromsø nevertheless confirmed their status as one of the best teams in the Norwegian Premier League that season.

Høgmo has also served as commentator for NRK's football coverage called "4-4-2".

On 27 September 2013 Per Mathias Høgmo replaced Egil Olsen as coach of Norway. Olsen agreed to stand down following the World Cup qualifying defeat at home to Switzerland.
 On 16 November 2016 Høgmo quit after three years in charge.

Career

Manager 
 Gratangen IL (playing manager, 1989)
 Tromsdalen UIL (1990–91)
 Tromsø IL (1992)
 Fossum IF (1993–94)
 Norway U-19 (1993)
 Norway U-15 (1994)
 Norway U-16 (1995)
 Moss FK (1995–96)
 Promoted to Tippeligaen in 1995
 Norway U-17 (1996)
 Norway women's national football team (1997–2000)
 4th place in the World Cup in 1999
 1st place in the Olympics in 2000
 Norway U-21 (2000–03)
 Tromsø IL (2004)
 4th place in Tippeligaen, which meant qualifying for Royal League
 Rosenborg BK (2005–06)
 Qualified for UEFA Champions League in 2005
 Tromsø IL (2008-2012)
 Djurgårdens IF (2013)
 Norway national team (2013-2016)
 Fredrikstad (2017-2018)
 Norway Youth Academy (2020)
 BK Häcken (2021-)

Player 
 Gratangen IL (1977)
 FK Mjølner (1978–83)
 Tromsø IL (1984–85)
 IFK Norrköping (1985–86)
 Tromsø IL (1986–89)

Author 
 Mental trening i fotball (en. Mental training in football), 2004 –

Managerial statistics

References

External links 

 

1959 births
Living people
Sportspeople from Tromsø
Norwegian footballers
Norway international footballers
Allsvenskan players
FK Mjølner players
Tromsø IL players
IFK Norrköping players
Norwegian football managers
Tromsø IL managers
Moss FK managers
Norway women's national football team managers
Rosenborg BK managers
1999 FIFA Women's World Cup managers
Norwegian expatriate footballers
Norwegian expatriate football managers
Expatriate footballers in Sweden
Djurgårdens IF Fotboll managers
Norway national football team managers
Fredrikstad FK managers
Eliteserien managers
Association football midfielders